Cavalcade was a British weekly news magazine which was in circulation between 1936 and 1950. It was modelled on the American magazine Time. The first issue of Cavalcade appeared in February 1936. The founding publisher was News Periodicals Ltd. In 1937 Cavalcade reported that its circulation was 50,000 copies, but next year the magazine was sold due to financial problems.

Cavalcade was the only British publication which published the photographs of King Edward and Wallis Simpson in the summer of 1936 taken when they were on holiday. These photographs made their relationship publicly known for the first time.

References

1936 establishments in the United Kingdom
1950 disestablishments in the United Kingdom
News magazines published in the United Kingdom
Defunct magazines published in the United States
Magazines established in 1936
Magazines disestablished in 1950
Weekly magazines published in the United Kingdom